Santa Cruz or Santacruz is a surname of Iberian origin, referring to the holy cross, symbol of Christianity.

Notable people with this name

Arts and entertainment
Abel Santa Cruz (1915–1995), major Argentine screenwriter
Daniel Santacruz (born 1976), American musician, singer and record producer
Francesc Santacruz i Artigas (fl. 1665–1721), Catalan sculptor
Kendra Santacruz (born 1989), Mexican television actress
Pedro Ferriz Santacruz (1921–2013), veteran radio and television presenter in Mexico

Sports
Danilo Santacruz (born 1995), Paraguayan footballer
Estéban Santa Cruz (born 1885), Cuban baseball player
Hugo Santacruz (born 1989), Paraguayan footballer
Javier Flores Santacruz (born 1986), Spanish footballer
José Armando Santa Cruz (born 1980), a Mexican boxer
Rafael Carlos Santacruz (born 1983), Spanish footballer
Roque Santa Cruz (born 1981), Paraguayan footballer

Other people
Álvaro de Bazán, 1st Marquis of Santa Cruz (1526–1588), Spanish admiral
Andrés de Santa Cruz (1792-1865), president of Peru and Bolivia
José Santacruz Londoño (1943–1996), a Colombian drug lord
Lorenzo Carbonell Santacruz (1883–1968), mayor of Alicante, 1931–1936
Manuel Santa Cruz Loidi (1842-1926), Spanish Carlist guerilla leader and missionary
Roque González de Santa Cruz (1576–1628), Paraguayan saint

See also
Cruz
De la Cruz
Santa Cruz (disambiguation)

Spanish-language surnames